Spec Martin Stadium is a 6,000 seat football stadium located in DeLand, Florida. Spec Martin Stadium currently hosts Stetson Hatters football, DeLand High School Bulldog football and was the host of the Central Florida Warriors rugby league team. The stadium was known as DeLand Municipal Stadium from is opening in 1941 until it was renamed in 1973.

History
The stadium had served as home of the Stetson University Hatters football team before the school discontinued its football program in 1956, and in 2013 it once again featured Hatters football when Stetson started play in the Pioneer Football League after a 57-year hiatus.

Renovations
As part of Stetson's re-entry into college football, Spec Martin Stadium underwent significant renovations, including a new press box, handicapped and premium seating areas, and new locker room facilities.

Notable events
Spec Martin Stadium was a filming location for the 1998 film The Waterboy starring Adam Sandler. In the movie, the stadium depicted the home field of the fictional South Central Louisiana State Mud Dogs.

The stadium hosted a qualifying match between Canada and Jamaica for the 2017 Rugby League World Cup on December 8, 2015. The match ended in an 18–18 draw; neither team qualified for the World Cup, as they both lost qualifying matches to the USA.

See also
 List of NCAA Division I FCS football stadiums
 List of rugby league stadiums by capacity

References

External links
 Deland.org
 News-journalonline.com

College football venues
College lacrosse venues in the United States
Stetson Hatters football
American football venues in Florida
Rugby league in Florida
Rugby league stadiums in the United States
Sports venues completed in 1941
1941 establishments in Florida